Chaneyville is a small, rural unincorporated community located at the crossroads of MD 4, Chaneyville Road, and Fowler Road in Calvert County, Maryland, United States. It is generally considered part of either Owings or Dunkirk.

Unincorporated communities in Calvert County, Maryland
Unincorporated communities in Maryland